Ivan Simon Cary Elwes (born 26 October 1962) is an English actor and writer. He is known for his leading film roles as Westley in The Princess Bride (1987), Robin Hood in Robin Hood: Men in Tights (1993), and Dr. Lawrence Gordon in the Saw film series. Elwes' other performances in films include Glory (1989), Hot Shots! (1991), The Jungle Book (1994), Days of Thunder (1990), Bram Stoker's Dracula (1992), Twister (1996), Kiss the Girls (1997), Liar Liar (1997), Cradle Will Rock (1999), Shadow of the Vampire (2000), The Cat's Meow (2001), Ella Enchanted (2004), The Alphabet Killer (2008), A Christmas Carol (2009), No Strings Attached (2011), and The Hyperions (2022). He has appeared on television in a number of series including The X-Files, Seinfeld, From the Earth to the Moon, Psych, Life in Pieces, Stranger Things, and The Marvelous Mrs. Maisel.

Early life 
Ivan Simon Cary Elwes was born on 26 October 1962 in Westminster, London. He is the youngest of three sons of portrait painter Dominic Elwes and interior designer and socialite Tessa Kennedy. Elwes is the brother of artist Damian Elwes and film producers Cassian Elwes and Milica Kastner. His stepfather, Elliott Kastner, was an American film producer and the first American to set up independent film production in the United Kingdom. His paternal grandfather was the portrait painter Simon Elwes, whose own father was the diplomat and tenor Gervase Elwes (1866–1921). Elwes has English, Irish, Scottish, Croatian-Jewish, and Serbian ancestry, the latter two from his maternal grandmother, Daška McLean, whose second husband, Billy McLean, was an operative for Special Operations Executive during World War II.

One of Elwes's relatives is the British miser John Elwes, who was the inspiration for Ebenezer Scrooge in A Christmas Carol (1843), having been referenced by Charles Dickens himself in chapter six of his last completed novel, Our Mutual Friend. Elwes himself played five roles in the 2009 film adaptation of A Christmas Carol. Through his maternal grandfather, Elwes is also related to Sir Alexander William "Blackie" Kennedy, one of the first photographers to document the archaeological site of Petra following the collapse of the Ottoman Empire.

Elwes was brought up as a Catholic and was an altar boy at Westminster Cathedral. His paternal relatives include such clerics as Dudley Charles Cary-Elwes (1868–1932), the Bishop of Northampton and Abbot Columba Cary-Elwes (Ampleforth Abbey, Saint Louis Abbey). He discussed this in an interview while he was filming the 2005 CBS television film Pope John Paul II, in which he played the young priest Karol Wojtyła.

Elwes's parents divorced when he was four years old. In 1975, when Elwes was 13, his father committed suicide. He was educated at Harrow School, and the London Academy of Music and Dramatic Art. In 1981, he moved to the United States to study acting at Sarah Lawrence College in Bronxville, New York. While living there, Elwes studied acting at both the Actors Studio and the Lee Strasberg Theatre and Film Institute under the tutelage of Al Pacino's mentor, Charlie Laughton (not to be confused with English actor Charles Laughton). As a teenager, he also worked as a production assistant on the films Absolution, Octopussy, and Superman, where he was assigned to Marlon Brando. When Elwes introduced himself to the actor, Brando insisted on calling him "Rocky" after Rocky Marciano.

Career

Film 
Elwes made his acting debut in 1984 with Marek Kanievska's film Another Country, which was loosely based on the English boarding school exploits of British spies Burgess, Philby and MacLean. He played James Harcourt, a gay student. He went on to play Guilford Dudley in the British historical drama film Lady Jane, opposite Helena Bonham Carter. He was then cast as stable-boy-turned-swashbuckler Westley in Rob Reiner's fantasy-comedy The Princess Bride (1987), which was based on the novel of the same name by William Goldman. It was a modest box office success, but received critical acclaim.  As a result of years of reviews, it earned a score of 97% on the review aggregation website Rotten Tomatoes. Since being released on home video and television, the film has become a cult classic.

Elwes continued to work steadily, varying between dramatic roles, such as in the Oscar-winning Glory (1989), and comedic roles, as in Hot Shots! (1991). He played a rival driver to Tom Cruise in Days of Thunder (1990). In 1993, he starred as Robin Hood in Mel Brooks's comedy Robin Hood: Men in Tights. Elwes then appeared in supporting roles in such films as Francis Ford Coppola's adaptation of Bram Stoker's Dracula (1992), The Crush (1993), The Jungle Book (1994), Twister (1996), Liar Liar (1997), and Kiss the Girls. In 1999, he portrayed famed theatre and film producer John Houseman for Tim Robbins in his ensemble film based on Orson Welles's musical, Cradle Will Rock. Following that, he travelled to Luxembourg to work with John Malkovich and Willem Dafoe in Shadow of the Vampire. In 2001, he co-starred in Peter Bogdanovich's ensemble film The Cat's Meow portraying movie mogul Thomas Ince, who died mysteriously while vacationing with William Randolph Hearst on his yacht.

In 2004, Elwes starred in the horror–thriller Saw which, at a budget of a little over $1 million, grossed over $100 million worldwide. The same year he appeared in Ella Enchanted, this time as the villain, not the hero. He made an uncredited appearance as Sam Green, the man who introduced Andy Warhol to Edie Sedgwick, in the 2006 film Factory Girl. In 2007, he appeared in Garry Marshall's Georgia Rule opposite Jane Fonda.

In 2010, he returned to the Saw franchise in Saw 3D (2010), the seventh film in the series, as Dr. Lawrence Gordon. In 2011, he was selected by Ivan Reitman to star alongside Natalie Portman in No Strings Attached. That same year, Elwes and Garry Marshall teamed up again in the ensemble romantic comedy New Year's Eve opposite Robert de Niro and Halle Berry.

In 2012, Elwes starred in the independent drama The Citizen. and the following year Elwes joined Selena Gomez for the comedy ensemble, Behaving Badly directed by Tim Garrick. In 2015, he completed Sugar Mountain directed by Richard Gray; the drama We Don't Belong Here, opposite Anton Yelchin and Catherine Keener directed by Peer Pedersen, and Being Charlie which reunited Elwes with director Rob Reiner after 28 years and premiered at the Toronto International Film Festival. In 2016, Elwes starred opposite Penelope Cruz in Fernando Trueba's Spanish-language period pic The Queen of Spain, a sequel to Trueba's 1998 drama The Girl of Your Dreams. This also re-united Elwes with his Princess Bride co-star, Mandy Patinkin.

Television 
Elwes made his first television appearance in 1996 as David Lookner on Seinfeld. Two years later he played astronaut Michael Collins in the Golden Globe Award-winning HBO miniseries From the Earth To the Moon. The following year Elwes was nominated for a Golden Satellite Award for Best Performance by an Actor in a Mini-Series or Motion Picture Made for Television for his portrayal of Colonel James Burton in The Pentagon Wars directed by Richard Benjamin. In 1999, he guest starred as Dr. John York in an episode of the television series The Outer Limits. Shortly afterward he received another Golden Satellite Award nomination for his work on the ensemble NBC Television film Uprising opposite Jon Voight directed by Jon Avnet. Elwes had a recurring role in the final season (from 2001 to 2002) of Chris Carter's hit series The X-Files as FBI Assistant Director Brad Follmer.

In 2004, he portrayed serial killer Ted Bundy in the A&E Network film The Riverman, which became one of the highest rated original films in the network's history and garnered a prestigious BANFF Rockie Award nomination. The following year, Elwes played the young Karol Wojtyła in the CBS television film Pope John Paul II. The TV film was highly successful not only in North America but also in Europe, where it broke box office records in the late Pope's native Poland and became the first film ever to break $1 million in three days.

In 2007, he made a guest appearance on the Law & Order: Special Victims Unit episode "Dependent" as a Mafia lawyer. In 2009, he played the role of Pierre Despereaux, an international art thief, in the fourth-season premiere of Psych. In 2010, he returned to Psych, reprising his role in the second half of the fifth season, again in the show's sixth season, and again in the show's eighth season premiere. In 2014, Elwes played Hugh Ashmeade, Director of the CIA, in the second season of the BYUtv series Granite Flats.

In May 2015, Elwes was cast as Arthur Davenport, a shrewd and eccentric world-class collector of illegal art and antiquities in Crackle's first streaming network series drama, The Art of More, which explored the cutthroat world of premium auction houses. The series debuted on 19 November and was picked up for a second season.

In April 2018 Elwes portrayed Larry Kline, Mayor of Hawkins, for the third season of the Netflix series Stranger Things, which premiered in July 2019. In May 2019, it was announced that he would be joining the third season of the Amazon series The Marvelous Mrs. Maisel as Gavin Hawk.

Voice-over work 
Elwes's voice-over work includes the narrator in James Patterson's audiobook The Jester, as well as characters in film and television animations such as Quest for Camelot, Pinky and The Brain, Batman Beyond, and the English versions of the Studio Ghibli films, Porco Rosso, Whisper of the Heart and The Cat Returns. For the 2004 video game The Bard's Tale, he served as screenwriter, improviser, and voice actor of the main character The Bard. In 2009, Elwes reunited with Jason Alexander for the Indian film, Delhi Safari. The following year Elwes portrayed the part of Gremlin Gus in Disney's video game, Epic Mickey 2: The Power of Two. In 2014, he appeared in Cosmos: A Spacetime Odyssey as the voice of scientists Edmond Halley and Robert Hooke.

Motion capture work 
In 2009 Elwes joined the cast of Robert Zemeckis's motion capture adaptation of Charles Dickens' A Christmas Carol portraying five roles. That same year he was chosen by Steven Spielberg to appear in his motion capture adaptation of Belgian artist Hergé's popular comic strip The Adventures of Tintin: The Secret of the Unicorn.

Theatre 
In 2003 Elwes portrayed Kerry Max Cook in the off-Broadway play The Exonerated in New York, directed by Bob Balaban (18–23 March 2003).

Literature 
In October 2014 Touchstone (Simon & Schuster) published Elwes's memoir of the making of The Princess Bride, entitled As You Wish: Inconceivable Tales from the Making of The Princess Bride, which Elwes co-wrote with Joe Layden. The book featured never-before-told stories, exclusive behind-the-scenes photographs, and interviews with co-stars Robin Wright, Wallace Shawn, Billy Crystal, Christopher Guest, Fred Savage and Mandy Patinkin, as well as author and screenwriter William Goldman, producer Norman Lear, and director Rob Reiner. The book debuted on The New York Times Best Seller list.

Other projects 
In 2014, Elwes co-wrote the screenplay for a film entitled Elvis & Nixon, about the pair's famous meeting at the White House in 1970. The film, which starred Michael Shannon and Kevin Spacey, was bought by Amazon as their first theatrical feature and was released on 22 April 2016.

Lawsuit 
In August 2005, Elwes filed a lawsuit against Evolution Entertainment, his management firm and producer of Saw. Elwes said he was promised a minimum of one percent of the producers' net profits of the film and did not receive the full amount. The case was settled out of court. Elwes would not return to the series until 2010, where he reprised his role in Saw 3D.

Personal life 
Elwes met photographer Lisa Marie Kurbikoff in 1991 at a chili cook-off in Malibu, California, and they became engaged in 1997. They married in 2000 and have one daughter together.

In March 2021, Elwes posted on his social media accounts that his younger sister Milica had died after battling Stage 4 cancer for more than a year. 

Elwes is known for his feud with Republican Texas Senator and Princess Bride fan Ted Cruz. According to the Hollywood Reporter, Elwes initiated the 2020 fundraiser that re-united many Princess Bride cast members to support Joe Biden in the battleground state of Wisconsin. The Princess Bride Reunion raised more than $4 million for Wisconsin Democrats.

Filmography

Film

Television

Video games

Books

References

External links 

 

1962 births
Living people
20th-century English male actors
21st-century English male actors
21st-century English memoirists
Alumni of the London Academy of Music and Dramatic Art
British expatriate male actors in the United States
English expatriates in the United States
English male film actors
English male stage actors
English male television actors
English male voice actors
English people of Croatian-Jewish descent
English people of Irish descent
English people of Scottish descent
English people of Serbian descent
English Roman Catholics
Lee Strasberg Theatre and Film Institute alumni
Male actors from London
People educated at Harrow School
People from Westminster
People of Anglo-Irish descent
Sarah Lawrence College alumni